The First Saionji Cabinet is the 12th Cabinet of Japan led by Saionji Kinmochi from January 7, 1906, to July 14, 1908.

Cabinet

References 

Cabinet of Japan
1906 establishments in Japan
Cabinets established in 1906
Cabinets disestablished in 1908